The 1961 Central Michigan Chippewas football team represented Central Michigan University in the Interstate Intercollegiate Athletic Conference (IIAC) during the 1961 NCAA College Division football season.  In their 11th season under head coach Kenneth Kelly, the Chippewas compiled a 2–8 record (1–5 against IIAC opponents) and were outscored by their opponents by a combined total of 214 to 95.

The team's statistical leaders included quarterback Gary Harrington with 239 passing yards and Chuck Koons with 402 rushing yards and 130 receiving yards. Guard Jim Hasse received the team's most valuable player award. Two Central Michigan players (Hasse and defensive end Bill Johnson) received first-team honors on the All-IIAC team.

Schedule

References

Central Michigan
Central Michigan Chippewas football seasons
Central Michigan Chippewas football